Apion cruentatum  is a species of beetle in the family Brentidae. It is found in the Palearctic.

References

Brentidae
Beetles described in 1844